Formica aerata, the grey field ant, is a species of ant in the family Formicidae.

References

Further reading

 

aerata
Articles created by Qbugbot
Insects described in 1973